"I See the Rain" is a 1967 song recorded by The Marmalade, written by lead guitarist William Junior Campbell and vocalist Dean Ford (born Thomas McAleese).

This was the band's third  CBS Records release, following their 1966 name change from Dean Ford and the Gaylords and change of label from Columbia (EMI) to CBS, and was one year before their first successful UK release "Lovin' Things". The self-penned recording was praised by Jimi Hendrix as the "best cut of 1967."

The recording became a chart-topper in the Netherlands that same year. Graham Nash of The Hollies, contributed to the session, but it did not chart in the UK, although the track, with its distinct mid-1960s psychedelic feel, has since attained a cult following and has been covered by artists such as Susanna Hoffs of The Bangles and Matthew Sweet (see Under the Covers, Vol. 1). Canadian group The Great Flood made the RPM Top Singles Chart with their version, entering the chart on June 29, 1968 and peaking at #83 two weeks later.

The Marmalade's original recording also was used in an advertisement campaign by Gap Inc. in 2002.  A commercial was directed by the Coen brothers and featured Dennis Hopper and Christina Ricci.

References

1967 singles
CBS Records singles
Marmalade (band) songs
1967 songs
Songs written by Junior Campbell